Ted Collins may refer to:

Ted Collins (Canadian football)
Ted Collins (manager), entertainment manager and owner of football teams
Ted Collins (footballer, born 1882) (1882–19??), English footballer
Ted Collins (Australian footballer) (1893–1974), Australian footballer
Ted Collins (footballer, born 2003), English footballer

See also
Edward Collins (disambiguation)